Afterwards is a 1933 mystery play by the British-American writer Walter C. Hackett revolving around a psychic medium.

It enjoyed a West End run of 208 performances at the Whitehall Theatre between 7 November 1933 and 12 June 1934. The original London cast included Gordon Harker, Henry Daniell, Ronald Shiner, Jeanne Stuart and Marion Lorne.

Adaptation
It was adapted into the 1934 Hollywood film Their Big Moment directed by James Cruze and starring Zasu Pitts.

References

Bibliography
 Goble, Alan. The Complete Index to Literary Sources in Film. Walter de Gruyter, 1999.
 Wearing, J.P. The London Stage 1930-1939: A Calendar of Productions, Performers, and Personnel.  Rowman & Littlefield, 2014.

1933 plays
British plays adapted into films
West End plays
Plays by Walter C. Hackett